Niamh Smyth (born 5 May 1978) is an Irish Fianna Fáil politician who has been a Teachta Dála (TD) for the Cavan–Monaghan constituency since the 2016 general election. She was appointed Chair of the Committee on Media, Tourism, Arts, Culture, Sport and the Gaeltacht in September 2020.

She was a member of Cavan County Council from 2009 to 2016.

Smyth was elected as the first president of the Fianna Fáil women's network on 14 September 2015. In May 2016, she was appointed to the Fianna Fáil Front Bench as Spokesperson for the Arts and Heritage.

Personal and early life
Smyth was born to Dessie and Maura Smyth. Dessie is originally from Knockbride and is a nephew of Patrick Smith, a former Fianna Fáil founding member and politician.

Smyth is married to James Conaty and they have one daughter together. They have been separated since 2018.

References

External links

Niamh Smyth's page on the Fianna Fáil website

1978 births
Living people
Politicians from County Cavan
Fianna Fáil TDs
Local councillors in County Cavan
Members of the 32nd Dáil
Members of the 33rd Dáil
21st-century women Teachtaí Dála